Punjabi Bagh is a station on the Green Line of the Delhi Metro and is located in the West Delhi district of Delhi. It is an elevated station with parking facilities and was inaugurated on 2 April 2010.

Station layout

Facilities

There are HDFC Bank and Canara Bank ATMs at Punjabi Bagh metro station.

Connections

See also
List of Delhi Metro stations
Transport in Delhi
Delhi Metro Rail Corporation
Delhi Suburban Railway
List of rapid transit systems in India

References

External links

 Delhi Metro Rail Corporation Ltd. (Official site) 
 Delhi Metro Annual Reports
 
 UrbanRail.Net – descriptions of all metro systems in the world, each with a schematic map showing all stations.

Delhi Metro stations
Railway stations opened in 2010
Railway stations in West Delhi district